Wakehurst may refer to:

Places:
Electoral district of Wakehurst, electoral district of the Legislative Assembly in the Australian state of New South Wales
Wakehurst (formerly known as Wakehurst Place), a property owned by the National Trust and managed by Royal Botanic Gardens, Kew, located near Ardingly, West Sussex, southern England

Schools:
Wakehurst Public School in Belrose, a suburb of Sydney, Australia

Peerage:
Baron Wakehurst, of Ardingly in the County of Sussex, is a title in the Peerage of the United Kingdom
Gerald Loder, 1st Baron Wakehurst, LLB JP DL (1861–1936), British barrister, businessman and Conservative politician
John Loder, 2nd Baron Wakehurst KG, KCMG, GCStJ (1895–1970), British Army officer, politician and colonial administrator

See also
Akehurst
Akhurst